Auldhouse is a hamlet in South Lanarkshire, around  to the south of the suburban edge of East Kilbride.

History
The first mention of the hamlet is in the Public Archives is 1602, and it is probable that Auldhouse, or Old House, owes its name to an ancient building located there. It owes its origins to the drove roads in the area. One such road passed through East Kilbride, and went south via Auldhouse and nearby Fieldhead.

Recently, with the development of the Benthall Farm housing development, the hamlet is just outwith the suburbs of East Kilbride

Politics
The area is administered by Auldhouse, Lindsayfield and Chapelton Community Council. There are four local councillors who cover Auldhouse, the council ward being Avondale and Stonehouse. Auldhouse is represented in the Scottish Parliament by the MSP Mairi McAllan of the Scottish National Party (SNP) for the Clydesdale constituency, and in Westminster in the East Kilbride, Strathaven and Lesmahagow constituency by Lisa Cameron (SNP).

Amenities
The village contains the Auldhouse Arms public house and Auldhouse Primary School. Nearby is the Langlands Moss Nature Reserve. Langlands Moss, a lowland raised bog to the North East of Auldhouse, was the first designated Local Nature Reserve in South Lanarkshire which was formally established in 1996.

Auldhouse Primary School has a maximum capacity of 50 pupils, with a current roll of 48. Of the five original village schools in the East Kilbride area, only Auldhouse remains. The Old Village School in East Kilbride closed in 1974 and Jackton School in 1988. Maxwellton Endowed School was sold as a private residence in 1911 and Millwell Endowed School, between Laigh Cleughearn Farm and the Rutherend Toll, was shut down as far back as 1872.

The average house price value in the area is £133,189.

References

External links

Villages in South Lanarkshire